David Tutera (born April 23, 1966) is an American celebrity wedding planner, bridal fashion designer, author and professional speaker. He is the host of WE TVs show, My Fair Wedding with David Tutera and David Tutera's CELEBrations.

Tutera is the author of seven books.

Personal life
In September 2003, he married Ryan Jurica in Vermont. The couple separated on New Year’s Day 2013, shortly after their surrogate became pregnant. On June 19, 2013, Tutera's daughter, Cielo, and Jurica's son, Cedric, were born. On April 1, 2017, Tutera married Joey Toth, and they currently reside in Los Angeles.

Professional life
Tutera’s grandfather, a successful florist, first noticed his grandson’s artistic ability at an early age and encouraged David to pursue his passion.  At the age of 19, with the advice of his grandfather and only one client, Tutera opened his event planning business.

Currently in its 9th season, My Fair Wedding with David Tutera airs on WE tv. When asked about featuring a gay wedding on his wedding planning show, Tutera replied that he has "no hand in the casting process."

Tutera has partnered with Mon Cheri to launch the "David Tutera for Mon Cheri" wedding dress collection. He has teamed with Jo-Ann Fabric and Craft Stores to create Down the Aisle in Style, a line of wedding accessories. He is also a professional speaker hired to lecture on the topics of weddings, lifestyle, and design.

Tutera contributes a regular column in Bridal Guide magazine.

Accolades
David has been awarded "Best Celebrity Wedding Planner" by Life & Style Magazine.

Tutera was named by Modern Bride magazine as one of the Top 25 Trendsetters of the Year.

Notable events

His planning list includes Star Jones' wedding, the Wien wedding, Shannen Doherty's Malibu wedding to Kurt Iswarienko, NY Giants Antonio Pierce’s wedding, the official post Grammy parties in New York City, events for Matthew McConaughey, Elton John' wedding, Barbara Walters, The Rolling Stones, Vice President Al Gore at the White House, Kenneth Cole, Tommy Hilfiger, Susan Lucci, the John F. Kennedy Center, film premieres, and celebrity parties for royalty, politicians, and socialites. Tutera has designed events for charities including the Prevent Cancer Foundation, the Alzheimer's Association, DIFFA (Design Industries Foundation Fighting AIDS), and The Nature Conservancy.

References

External links

Company profile

1966 births
Living people
20th-century American LGBT people
21st-century American LGBT people
American fashion designers
American television hosts
LGBT fashion designers
American LGBT broadcasters
LGBT people from New York (state)
People from Port Chester, New York
Television personalities from New York (state)
American gay artists
American gay writers